Lely High School is a four-year public high school located in Lely Resort, Collier County, Florida, about  southeast of Downtown Naples.

The school serves Naples Manor, Marco Island, Lely, Verona Walk, and some unincorporated areas of Collier County. The school is a part of the District School Board of Collier County. Lely's Feeder Schools are East Naples Middle, Manatee Middle, and Marco Island Charter Middle.

History 
Lely High School opened its doors to students in the 1974-75 school year. In the 1990s the population of Naples was rising. As a result, Lely was becoming overcrowded, so three new buildings were added onto the school.

In 2004 Golden Gate High School opened, which relieved the overcrowding of both Lely and Naples High School. When the 2010-11 year zone change took place, students were placed into Golden Gate from Naples and Lely High to keep the student populations equal.

Demographics 
Lely is 39.56% Hispanic, 35.85% White, 21.5% Black, 0.55% Asian.

JROTC 
Members of JROTC are called Cadets. There are four teams for cadets; Drill Team, Exhibition, Color Guard, and Raiders. The Drill Team has a Drill Competition in March. Raiders also have a Raider competition. In the summer a handful of cadets get accepted to go to Summer camp with other schools in the area.

Clubs and honor societies 
The school is home to several extracurricular clubs and honor societies. The following is a list of just some of the many clubs and societies the school offers:

 Academic Team
 Key Club
 Mu Alpha Theta
 National Honor Society
 Spanish Honor Society
 JROTC
 Art Club
 Chemistry club
 Drama Club
 Debate Team
 Future Business Leaders of America (FBLA)
 Poetry Club
 C.O.R.E. Society

Music department 
The following are ensembles (or groups) that Lely High School currently offers to its students for participation:
Marching Band, Jazz Band, Symphonic Band, Concert Band, Color Guard/Flagline, and Orchestra.

In the spring of 2015, the LHS Symphonic Band received an overall rating of SUPERIOR at the District 18 concert band festival. This was the first time the group had received such a rating since 2004.

In the fall of 2015, The Lely Trojan Marching Band received straight superior ratings and in the spring of 2016, both the concert band and symphonic band received straight superior ratings for the concert MPA.

Sports

Boys and girls 
 Basketball 
Cross Country 
 Golf 
 Lacrosse
 Soccer 
 Swimming & Diving 
 Tennis
 Track & Field

Boys
 Baseball 
 Wrestling
 Football

Girls
 Cheerleading 
 Softball 
 Volleyball

Notable alumni
Makinton Dorleant, NFL cornerback.
Keith Eloi, former NFL and United Football League wide receiver
Lauren Embree, tennis pro and University of Florida graduate
Asmahan Farhat (Mercedes Farhat), a swimmer who represented Libya at the 2008 Summer Olympics
Steve Octavien, former NFL linebacker.
Jesse Witten, tennis pro and University of Kentucky graduate.

References

External links
 

High schools in Collier County, Florida
Public high schools in Florida
1975 establishments in Florida